Plakortis bergquistae is a species of marine sponge in the order Homosclerophorida, first described in 2011 by Guilherme Muricy. The species epithet, bergquistae, honours Patricia Bergquist.

Distribution
The holotype was collected near Bitung, North Sulawesi, Sulawesi Sea. In Australia it is found in the IMCRA region "Northwest Shelf Transition".

References

Homoscleromorpha
Animals described in 2011
Sponges of Australia
Taxa named by Guilherme Muricy